The 1921–22 Scottish Division Two was the first season of play in the Scottish Division Two after World War I. It was also the first season of automatic promotion and relegation in the Scottish Football League.

The division was won by Alloa Athletic, who were promoted to Division One. Clackmannan finished bottom of the division.

Table

References 

 Scottish Football Archive

Scottish Division Two seasons
2
Scot